Gordon Sherritt (April 8, 1919 – March 12, 2005) was a Canadian professional ice hockey player who played eight games in the National Hockey League for the Detroit Red Wings during the 1943–44 season. The rest of his career, which lasted from 1939 to 1949, was mainly spent in the minor leagues. He was born in Oakville, Manitoba.

Career statistics

Regular season and playoffs

External links
 

1919 births
2005 deaths
Canadian ice hockey defencemen
Cleveland Barons (1937–1973) players
Detroit Red Wings players
Harringay Racers players
Ice hockey people from Manitoba
Indianapolis Capitals players
Minneapolis Millers (AHA) players
New Haven Eagles players
Portage Terriers players